Joanic is a station of the Barcelona Metro network located in the district of Gràcia. It's served by L4.

It's located under carrer de Pi i Margall between Plaça Joanic and carrer de l'Alegre de Dalt, and it can be accessed either from the former or from carrer de l'Escorial.

Services

See also
List of Barcelona Metro stations

External links

Joanic at Trenscat.com

Railway stations in Spain opened in 1973
Transport in Gràcia
Barcelona Metro line 4 stations